The 1948 Iowa State Teachers Panthers football team represented Iowa State Teachers College in the North Central Conference during the 1948 college football season. In its 11th season under head coach Clyde Starbeck, the team compiled a 7–3 record (5–0 against NCC opponents) and won the conference championship.

Five players were named to the all-conference team: halfbacks Paul Devan and Elvin Goodvin; tackles Jason Loving and Lee Wachenheim; and guard Harvey Wissler.

Schedule

References

Iowa State Teachers
Northern Iowa Panthers football seasons
North Central Conference football champion seasons
Iowa State Teachers Panthers football